Mark Knowles and Daniel Nestor were the defending champions but lost in the quarterfinals to Roger Federer and Max Mirnyi.

Federer and Mirnyi won in the final 7–5, 6–3 against Leander Paes and David Rikl.

Seeds

Draw

Final

Top half

Bottom half

External links
 2003 NASDAQ-100 Open Men's Doubles Draw

2003 NASDAQ-100 Open
Doubles